Nuri Mustafi (born 16 March 1983) is a Macedonian footballer of Albanian descent who last played for Danish 1st Division side Brønshøj BK as a midfielder.

Club career
He has previously played for GIF Sundsvall and Ljungskile SK in Sweden and for FC PoPa in Finland.

Personal life
Mustafi's brother Nebi Mustafi is a Macedonian international footballer.

References

External links

Brønshøj vil finde Mustafi-afløser internt, bold.dk, 19 February 2016

1983 births
Living people
Albanian footballers from North Macedonia
Association football midfielders
Macedonian footballers
KF Shkëndija players
Porin Palloilijat players
GIF Sundsvall players
Ljungskile SK players
Brønshøj Boldklub players
Macedonian First Football League players
Kakkonen players
Allsvenskan players
Superettan players
Danish 1st Division players
Macedonian expatriate footballers
Expatriate footballers in Finland
Macedonian expatriate sportspeople in Finland
Expatriate footballers in Sweden
Macedonian expatriate sportspeople in Sweden
Expatriate men's footballers in Denmark
Macedonian expatriate sportspeople in Denmark